The Newport Historical Society is a historical society in Newport, Rhode Island that was chartered in 1854 to collect and preserve books, manuscripts, and objects pertaining to Newport's history.

History of the society

Although the society was chartered in 1854, its collections originated thirty years earlier as the "Southern Cabinet" of the Rhode Island Historical Society, which was founded in 1822. By 1853, several prominent Newporters, including William Shepard Wetmore, recognized the need for a separate organization specifically devoted to preserving the history of Newport County, and the collections of the Southern Cabinet were reorganized under the auspices of the Newport Historical Society.

Ground was broken in 1902 for a brick library building at 82 Touro Street, which would be attached to the Sabbatarian Meeting House (previously acquired from Seventh Day Baptists by the society). The new building provided office space for the society, a fireproof vault for historic documents, and a library. In 1915, the meeting house was detached from the library and moved to the rear of the lot. A three story brick building was constructed between the library and the meeting house. Brick veneer, a slate roof, and steel shutters were added to the exterior of the meeting house to make its exterior covering consistent with the adjoining structures, and to provide added protection from the weather and the threat of fire.

The society features changing exhibits and has extensive holdings of colonial, silver, china, portraits, ship models, and over two hundred thousand historic photographs. Research facilities include archives with manuscript materials including the earliest town records, merchant account books, church records, etc. The library contains the second largest genealogical collection in Rhode Island. Walking tours leave from the Museum of Newport History.

Properties

Collections
 Museum collection
 Photographs and graphics collections
 Library collections

Special library collections

The major categories of library special collections at the Newport Historical Society are:
Business records
Maritime records
Church records 
Family papers
Diaries and journals
African-American history
Municipal records
Other collections

See also

List of libraries in Rhode Island

References

External links

NHS Online Catalog (includes archives, object, and photograph collections)

Infrastructure completed in 1902
1854 establishments in Rhode Island
Newport County, Rhode Island
Landmarks in Rhode Island
Libraries in Rhode Island
Buildings and structures in Newport, Rhode Island
Historical society museums in Rhode Island
Education in Newport County, Rhode Island
Historical societies in Rhode Island
Organizations established in 1854